Magilla Gorilla is a fictional gorilla and the star of The Magilla Gorilla Show by Hanna-Barbera that aired from 1963 to 1965.

Character description
Magilla Gorilla (voiced by Allan Melvin) is a fun-loving yet trouble-prone anthropomorphic gorilla who spends his time languishing in the front display window of Melvin Peebles' pet shop, eating bananas and being a drain on the shop's finances. Peebles (voiced by Howard Morris and later by Don Messick) frequently marks down his price considerably, but he is invariably only purchased for a short time, typically by some thieves who needed a gorilla to break into a bank or by an advertising agency looking for a mascot for their new product. The customers always ended up returning Magilla, forcing Peebles to give a refund. In the case of being bought by thieves, he was seized by police for being used in criminal activity and returned to Peebles' store. Magilla often ended episodes with his catchphrase "We'll try again next week."

Like many of Hanna-Barbera's animal characters, Magilla Gorilla sported human accessories: a purple bow tie, red shorts held up by green suspenders, a purple undersized derby hat, and brown dress shoes.

The only customer truly interested in owning Magilla was a little girl named Ogee (voiced by Jean Vander Pyl and pronounced "Oh Gee!"). During the cartoon's theme song, "We've Got a Gorilla for Sale", she asks hopefully, "How much is that gorilla in the window?" (a twist on the old standard, "(How Much Is) That Doggie in the Window?"), but she was never able to convince her parents to let her keep him.

In Yiddish, a megillah is a long tedious or embroidered account, from the Hebrew megillah, a story written in a scroll. One episode has Magilla saying, "Such a megillah over a gorilla."

Episodes

Season 1 (1964)

Season 2 (1965)

Inception
As pointed out on the Rhino Records' CD liner notes for their collection of Hanna-Barbera theme tunes, part of Magilla's purpose was to sell likenesses of himself. The show was sponsored by Ideal Toys, which produced a Magilla stuffed toy.

Other appearances

 Magilla Gorilla appeared in the medium of comic books. From 1964 through 1968, he appeared in a series published by Western Comics; the series ran 10 issues. Also in 1964, he appeared in a one shot comic called The Magilla Gorilla Kite Fun Book from the same publisher. From 1970 through 1971, he appeared in a series published by Charlton Comics which ran 5 issues.
 Magilla Gorilla appeared on both the 1972 made-for-TV movie Yogi's Ark Lark and the 1973 spin-off Yogi's Gang series, where he would run the treadmill that powers the Ark as long as there are plenty of bananas.
 In the 1982 special Yogi Bear's All Star Comedy Christmas Caper, Magilla Gorilla (alongside Wally Gator and Yakky Doodle) was unable to help Yogi and his friends locate J. Wellington Jones.
 Magilla appeared in the 1985-1988 syndicated series Yogi's Treasure Hunt.
 Magilla made a cameo appearance as an HB reporter in the 1988 TV-movie The Good, the Bad, and Huckleberry Hound.
 Magilla Gorilla appeared in A Yabba-Dabba-Doo Celebration! 50 Years of Hanna-Barbera.
 In the "Fender Bender 500" segment of the 1990 series Wake, Rattle, and Roll, Magilla Gorilla was partnered with Wally Gator as they rode a monster truck called the Swamp Stomper.
 In the oral folklore series of Magilla Gorrilla stories, the pet store owner (named Mr. Smith) is generally the one absent for most of the narrative, departing on business trips and the like. He leaves Magilla Gorilla in charge of the pet store in his absence, after warning Magilla not to get in any trouble. Adventures and chaos ensue, with Magilla often rectifying the situation mere moments before Mr. Smith's return. Upon Mr. Smith's inquiry as to whether there was any trouble, Magilla invariably replies with what was to become his most famous catch-phrase, "No trouble, no trouble at all."
 In Yo Yogi!, Magilla appeared as superstar rapper Magilla Ice (a spoof of Vanilla Ice).
 Magilla Gorilla appeared as Sinbad on the 1994 TV special Scooby-Doo! in Arabian Nights.
 In Harvey Birdman: Attorney At Law, Magilla Gorilla (voiced by Maurice LaMarche) made several cameos through the show, sometimes appearing as a homosexual prison inmate who is frequently seen stalking Harvey Birdman. In the 2005 episode "Free Magilla", Magilla is kidnapped by radical animal rights activists causing Mr. Peebles (also voiced by Maurice LaMarche) to sue them. Magilla is quickly abandoned by the activists after they grow sick of his many puns. During the course of the episode, Mr. Peebles confesses to having grown attached to Magilla.
 Magilla Gorilla made a cameo in a 2012 MetLife commercial entitled "Everyone".
 Magilla and Mr. Peebles make cameos in the 2013 direct-to-video film Scooby-Doo! Mask of the Blue Falcon as images in the Hanna-Barbera convention.
 Magilla Gorilla made a cameo in the Mad segment "Demise of the Planet of the Apes", where he is one of the occupants of the Super Ape Motel.
 In 2018, DC Comics rebooted Magilla Gorilla into a less cartoonish character and featured him in a crossover with Nightwing titled Nightwing/Magilla Gorilla Special #1. This version of Magilla is a famous actor living with Mr. Peebles who goes by the name Mel Peebles and gets murdered and Magilla is framed for the crime.
 Magilla Gorilla and Mr. Peebles appear in the Scooby-Doo and Guess Who? episode "Peebles' Pet Shop of Terrible Terrors" with Magilla Gorilla voiced by Frank Welker and Mr. Peebles voiced by Billy West. Magilla's ability to speak is downplayed by just making sounds and quoting "uh-huh." Both Peebles and Magilla are redesigned to match the 1970s look of Scooby-Doo. Wanda Sykes volunteers at Peebles' Pet Supply Mega-Store when a Fish Monster (vocal effects provided by Dee Bradley Baker) hatches from an egg and starts terrorizing the pet shop. In addition, Mr. Peebles has a bookkeeper named Arnie (also voiced by Billy West) working at his pet shop. Mystery Inc. helps solve the mystery of the Fish Monster. From the shadows, Magilla secretly gathers the pets that got loose and puts them back in their cage. With help from Magilla, Mystery Inc. and Wanda Sykes trap the Fish Monster and discover that the Fish Monster is Mr. Peebles where he wanted to have his pet shop closed so that he can get rid of Magilla (who Mr. Peebles claimed ate him out of house and home for 30 years) and start his own clothing line for short people. After Mr. Peebles is arrested by the police, Arnie becomes the new owner of Peebles' Pet Supply Mega-Store and Wanda Sykes adopts Magilla.
 Magilla Gorilla makes a cameo appearance in the 2020 Animaniacs revival segment "Suffragette City".
 Magilla Gorilla appeared in the 2021 film Space Jam: A New Legacy. He is seen watching the basketball game between the Tune Squad and the Goon Squad where he is shown riding a unicycle on the wires of an overhead power line.
 Magilla Gorilla and Mr. Peebles appeared in the HBO Max original series Jellystone!, with Magilla voiced by Paul F. Tompkins. In this show, Magilla wears glasses and run a clothing store in this series that Jabberjaw and Loopy De Loop works in. A running gag is that Jabberjaw pronounces his name as "Ma-Jilla" rather than the actual pronunciation.
 Mr. Peebles appeared in the 2021 special Scooby-Doo, Where Are You Now!

Cultural references
 The Brazilian boxer Adilson Rodrigues has called himself "Maguilla" after the cartoon.

Interpretation
According to Christopher P. Lehman, the trials of Magilla mirrored the attitudes that some American citizens had towards racial integration during the Civil Rights Movement in the 1960s. In his 2007 book American Animated Cartoons of the Vietnam Era: A Study of Social Commentary in Films and Television Programs, 1961-1973, Lehman writes that The Magilla Gorilla Show perpetuated the idea that non-whites should be segregated, with Peebles selling Magilla (the gorilla iconography thus evoking a reference to 19th-century racist artwork portraying blacks as subhuman primates) to white customers who would invariably return him to the pet shop by the end of each episode.

Magilla Gorilla in other languages
 Brazilian Portuguese: Maguila, o Gorila
 European Portuguese: O Show do Gorila Maguila
 Greek: The same as in English
 French: Maguilla le gorille
 Italian: The same as in English
 Spanish: Maguila Gorila
 Japanese: ゴリラのゴンちゃん (Gorira no Gon-chan)
 Finnish: The same as in English
 Hungarian: The same as in English
 Polish: Goryl Magilla (pronouncing with double "l")

See also
 List of fictional primates

References

External links
 Magilla Gorilla at Don Markstein's Toonopedia. Archived from the original on February 12, 2016.

Fictional gorillas
Hanna-Barbera characters
Fictional anthropomorphic characters
Television characters introduced in 1963
Male characters in animation